Horsehead/Marbella is an historic summer house at 240 Highland Drive in Jamestown, Rhode Island.  Occupying a spectacular setting on a southerly-projecting peninsula, this Shingle style house and carriage house were designed by Charles L. Bevins and built for industrialist Joseph Wharton in the 1880s.  It is also notable as an early example of the lower-key architectural styles associated with Jamestown's summer community, differentiating it from the more elaborate summer estates developed in nearby Newport.

The property was listed on the National Register of Historic Places in 1999.  It continues to be owned by Wharton's descendants.

See also

National Register of Historic Places listings in Newport County, Rhode Island

References

Houses on the National Register of Historic Places in Rhode Island
Houses in Newport County, Rhode Island
Buildings and structures in Jamestown, Rhode Island
National Register of Historic Places in Newport County, Rhode Island